Joakim Jensen is a retired Norwegian professional ice hockey player who spent most of his career with Storhamar of the Norwegian GET-ligaen. Jensen scored the overtime game-winning goal against Sparta in the longest professional ice hockey game of all time, game 5 of the 2016–17 quarterfinals.

References

External links

1987 births
Living people
Ice hockey people from Oslo
Baie-Comeau Drakkar players
Norwegian expatriate sportspeople in Canada
Manglerud Star Ishockey players
Storhamar Dragons players
Norwegian expatriate ice hockey people
Norwegian ice hockey right wingers